__notoc__

Fred Evans (born June 6, 1944) is an American philosopher. He is a Professor of philosophy at Duquesne University and Director of the Center for Interpretative and Qualitative Research. His research and teaching interests are in contemporary continental philosophy (Merleau-Ponty, Foucault, and Deleuze), social and political philosophy, and philosophy of language, psychology and technology.

Evans was born in Pittsburgh, Pennsylvania.  His work is informed both by his experiences as a psychologist and his time spent working under the auspices of an NGO in Laos during the 1970s. A reflection on these influences and his academic and activist work can be found in his brief intellectual biography at Duquesne's website.

Education 
 1966  B.A.  Philosophy, Indiana University, Bloomington
 1969  M.A. Philosophy, Indiana University, Bloomington
 1977  M.A. Psychology, University of Regina, Saskatchewan, Canada
 1986  Ph.D. Philosophy, State University of New York at Stony Brook

Authored and edited books 
(2008) The Multivoiced Body: Society and Communication in the Age of Diversity, Columbia University Press
(2000) Chiasms: Merleau-Ponty's Notion of the Flesh , co-edited with Leonard Lawlor, State University of New York Press
(1993) Psychology and Nihilism: A Genealogical Critique of the Computational Model of Mind, State University of New York Press

Selected articles 
"Voices of Democracy: Citizenship and Public Art (Millennium Park)," in Outrage! Art, Controversy, and Society, eds. Andrea Ritivoi and Judith Schachter (New York: Palgrave, forthcoming).
"Foucault and the 'Being of Language'," in The Cambridge-Foucault Lexicon, eds. Leonard Lawlor and John Nale (Cambridge: Cambridge University Press, forthcoming).
"9/11: The 'Clash of Civilizations' and Cultural Rights," Journal of Philosophy: A Cross-Disciplinary Inquiry, vol. 6, no. 14, Winter, 2011.
“’Unnatural Participations’:  Merleau-Ponty, Deleuze, and Environmental Ethics,” Philosophy Today, 54, 142-152.
"Deleuze, Bakhtin, and the 'Clamour of Voices', Deleuze Studies, vol. 2(2), 2008, 178-200.
“La sociedad de todas las voces: Los zapatistas, Bajtín y los derechos humanos,” traducción por Juan Carlos Grijalva, Alteridad (revista académica, Faculdad de Ciencias Humanas y de la Educación, Universidad Politécnica Salesiana, Ecuador), No. 5, Nov. 2008, 44-62 (Spanish trans. of published English versión).  Also published under the original title, *“Voces de Chiapas: los zapatistas, Bajtín y los derechos humanos,” in Sociedad (revista académica, Departamento de Ciencias Sociales de la Universidad Santiago de Cali, Colombia), forthcoming.
"Iris Marion Young and 'Intersecting Voices'," Philosophy Today, 52, 2008, 10-18. (SPEP Supplemental Volume 33 of Selected Studies in Phenomenology and Existential Philosophy, eds. Peg Birmingham and James Risser).
Entries on “Genealogical Critique” and “The Center for Interpretive and Qualitative Research,” for The SAGE Encyclopedia of Qualitative Research Methods, ed. Lisa M. Given (London: Sage Publications, Inc.), 369-71, 73-74, 2008.
"Chiasm and Flesh," in Merleau-Ponty: Key Concepts, eds. Rosalyn Diprose and Jack Reynolds. Stocksfield, UK: Acumen Publishing Limited, 2008, 184-193.
(with Barbara McCloskey), “Sixties Redux?: A Report from the 2004-05 Carnegie International (or Kutlug Ataman’s Provocation),” Kunst und Politik, Bd. 9, 2008, 175-181.
“Citizenship, Art and the Voices of the City: Wodiczko’s The Homeless Projection.” In Acts of Citizenship, eds. Engin Isin and Greg Nielsen. London: Zed Books, 2008, 227-246.
(with Barbara McCloskey) “The New Solidarity: A Case Study of Cross-Border Labor Networks and Mural Art in the Age of Globalization’.” In Toward a New Socialism, eds. Anatole Anton and Richard Schmitt. New York: Rowman and Littlefield, 2007, 483-496.
“Lyotard, Foucault, and ‘Philosophical Politics,’” International Journal of the Humanities, 3, 2006, 85-98.
Entries on “Psychology,” “Cognitive Science,” “Bakhtin,” “Hubert Dreyfus,” “Dialogism,” and “Heteroglossia/Monoglossia” for the Edinburgh University Press Dictionary of Continental Philosophy, ed. John Protevi, Edinburgh, Scotland: Edinburgh University Press Ltd., 2005, and for A Dictionary of Continental Philosophy, ed. John Protevi, Yale University, Yale University Press, 2006.
“Multi-Voiced Society: Philosophical Nuances on Salman Rushdie’s Midnight’s Children,” Florida Journal of International Law, 16:3, 2004, 727-741.
“Cyberspace and the Concept of Democracy,” Studies in Practical Philosophy: A Journal of Ethical and Political Philosophy, 4:1, 2004, 71-101. (Originally published in First Monday).
“Witnessing and the Social Unconscious,” Studies in Practical Philosophy: A Journal of Ethical and Political Philosophy, 3:2, Fall 2003, 57-83.
“Lyotard, Bakhtin, and Radical Heterogeneity,” Continental Philosophy, Vol.8, 2003, 61-74.
“Bakhtin, Communication, and the Politics of Multiculturalism.” Reprinted in Mikhail Bakhtin: Sage Masters of Modern Social Thought, vol. IV, ed. Michael E. Gardiner. London: SAGE Publications, 2003, 271-293. (Originally published in Constellations).
“Dialogisme et droits de l’Homme au Chiapas,” trans. Louis Jacob, Cahiers de recherche sociologique, no. 36, 2002, 75-104 (A translation of my “Voices of Chiapas”).
“Genealogy and the Problem of Affirmation in Nietzsche, Foucault, and Bakhtin,” Philosophy and Social Criticism, 27:3, 2001, 41-65.
“Cyberspace and the Concept of Democracy,” First Monday, Vol. 5 (10) (October 2000) URL: http://www.firstmonday.org/issues/issue5_10/evans/index.html (a peer-reviewed electronic publication).
“Voices of Chiapas: The Zapatistas, Bakhtin, and Human Rights,” Philosophy Today, 42, 2000, 196-210. (SPEP Supplemental Volume 25 of Selected Studies in Phenomenology and Existential Philosophy, ed. Linda Martín Alcoff and Walter Brogan).
“’Chaosmos’ and Merleau-Ponty's Philosophy of Nature,” Chiasmi International: Trilingual Studies Concerning the Thought of Merleau-Ponty, 2, 2000, 63-82.
“The Value of Flesh: Merleau-Ponty’s Philosophy and the Modernism/Postmodernism Debate” (with Leonard Lawlor); critical introductory essay to Chiasms: Merleau-Ponty's Notion of the Flesh, ed. Fred Evans and Leonard Lawlor. Albany, New York: State University of New York Press, 2000, 1-20.
“Merleau-Ponty, Lyotard and the Basis of Political Judgment,” in Rereading Merleau-Ponty: Essays Across the Continental-Analytic Divide, ed. Lawrence Hass and Dorothea Olkowski. New York, NY: Prometheus Press, 2000, 253-274.
“’Solar Love’: Nietzsche, Merleau-Ponty, and the Fortunes of Perception,” Continental Philosophy Review, vol. 31:2, 1998, 171-193.
“Voices, Oracles, and the Politics of Multiculturalism,” Symposium, vol. 2:2, 1998, 179-189.
“Bakhtin, Communication, and the Politics of Multiculturalism”, Constellations: An International Journal of Critical and Democratic Theory, vol. 5:3, 1998, 403-423.
“Technology as Art and the ‘Spheres of Freedom and Necessity,’” Research in Philosophy and Technology, vol. 14, 1994, 219-234.
“Marx, Nietzsche, and the ‘Voices of Democracy.’” In Paradigms in Political Theory: Marxism-Liberalism-Postmodernism, ed. Steven Jay Gold, Iowa State University Press, Spring, 1993, 79-97.
“To ‘Informate’ or ‘Automate’: The New Information Technologies and Democratization of the Work Place,” The Journal of Social Theory and Practice, vol. 17:3, 1991, 409-439.
“Cognitive Psychology, Phenomenology, and the ‘Creative Tension of Voices,’” Philosophy and Rhetoric, Vol. 24:2, 1991, 105-127.
“Language and Political Agency: Derrida, Marx, and Bakhtin,” The Southern Journal of Philosophy, vol. 28:4, 1990, 249-266.
“Marx, Nietzsche, and the ‘New Class,’” Journal of Speculative Philosophy, vol. 4:3, 1990, 505-524.
“Marx, Nietzsche, y ‘La Nueva Clase,’” trad. por Magdalena Holguin, Ideas y Valores, Num. 74-75, Agosto-Diciembre, 1987, Publicacion de la Universidad Nacional de Colombia, Bogotá, Colombia, 81-98.

See also
 American philosophy
 List of American philosophers

Academic homepage
Fred Evans's webpage at Duquesne University
Center for Interpretive and Qualitative Research

References 

1944 births
Living people
21st-century American philosophers
Duquesne University faculty